Lamir-e Sofla (also Romanized as Lamīr-e Soflá; also known as Lamīr-e Pā’īn, Lomar-e Bālā, and Lomar-e Soflá) is a village in Asalem Rural District, Asalem District, Talesh County, Gilan Province, Iran. At the 2006 census, its population was 2,370, in 534 families.

References 

Populated places in Talesh County